Dru, dru, or DRU may refer to:

People

Real persons (surname)
  (born 1987), French trampolinist
 Joanne Dru (1922–1996), American actress

Real persons (forename)
 Andrew Dru Castro (born 1976), American Grammy Award-winning recording engineer, producer and songwriter
 Dru Drury (1724–1803), British entomologist
 Dru C. Gladney, American anthropologist
 Dru Sjodin (1981–2003), American murder victim
 Dru Down (born 1973), stage name of American rapper and actor Danyle Robinson (born 1969)
 Dru (singer), Canadian singer-songwriter Andrew Grange
 Dru Samia (born 1997), American football player

Fictional characters (forename)
 Dru, Gru's twin brother in the 2017 film Despicable Me 3
 Drusilla 'Dru' Blackthorn, in the 2007+ media franchise The Shadowhunter Chronicles
 Drusilla 'Dru' Sartoris, in Faulkner's 1938 novel The Unvanquished
 Drucilla 'Dru' Winters, in the 1973+ American soap opera The Young and the Restless

DRU
 Danish Rugby Union, the governing body for rugby union in Denmark
 DRU Superliga, the highest tier of the national rugby union competition in Denmark
 Design Research Unit, one of the first generation of British design consultancies
 Direct Reporting Unit, an agency of the United States Department of the Air Force

In geography
 Aiguille du Dru, also known as the Dru, a mountain in the French Alps
 Dru Rock, Antarctica, an island

Other uses
 dru, ISO 639-3 code for the Rukai language of Taiwan